North American area code 607 is a state of New York telephone area code servicing parts of its Southern Tier (which borders Pennsylvania). It was created in 1954 by combining the southern portion of 315 and the eastern portion of 716. Initially, in the late 1940s, area codes with a middle digit of "0" (x0x-xxx-xxxx) were assigned only to jurisdictions covering an entire state. Along with 507 in Minnesota and 606 in Kentucky, 607 was among the first such area codes to be added to a jurisdiction.

Prior to October 2021, area code 607 had telephone numbers assigned for the central office code 988. In 2020, 988 was designated nationwide as a dialing code for the National Suicide Prevention Lifeline, which created a conflict for exchanges that permit seven-digit dialing. This area code was therefore scheduled to transition to ten-digit dialing by October 24, 2021.

Counties using 607
Allegany County (part)
Broome County
Chemung County
Chenango County
Cortland County
Delaware County
Otsego County
Schoharie County (part)
Schuyler County
Steuben County
Sullivan County (part)
Tioga County
Tompkins County
Yates County

Cities using 607
Binghamton
Corning
Cortland
Delhi
Elmira
Hornell
Ithaca
Norwich
Oneonta
Waverly
Deposit
Owego
Vestal

See also
List of New York area codes
List of NANP area codes
North American Numbering Plan

References

External links

607
607